Mohamed Konaté may refer to:

 Mohamed Konaté (footballer, born 1992), Malian footballer
 Mohamed Konaté (footballer, born 1997), Ivorian-Burkinabé footballer